John Connor (born 8 June 1953) is a Canadian former soccer player.

He played for the Edmonton Eagles of the Canadian Professional Soccer League, where he was part of the championship winning team.

He played for the Canadian Olympic team from 1975 to 1983. He also earned 4 caps for the Canadian senior national team in 1983.

References

External links

1953 births
Living people
Canada men's international soccer players
Canadian soccer players
Naturalized citizens of Canada
Footballers from Glasgow
Scottish emigrants to Canada
Olympic soccer players of Canada
Footballers at the 1976 Summer Olympics
Edmonton Eagles players
Association football midfielders
Association football forwards
Canadian Professional Soccer League (original) players